Sengottai  (also known as Shencottah, Chenkotta or Shenkottai) is a town in the Tenkasi district, of Tamil Nadu, India. It is the gateway to southern Tamil Nadu and Kerala. Spread over an area of 2.68 km2 with a population of over 26,823, the economy of the town revolves around the cultivation of rice.

History 
Sengottai was originally part of the Travancore Kingdom. In December 1851, the boundary between Tirunelveli and Travancore on the Sengottai side was clearly defined as proposed by General Cullen as early as 1846, and finally sanctioned by the Madras Government. Sengottai Municipality was constituted in 1921. In 1949, Sengottai was part of the newly formed state of Travancore-Cochin. The States Reorganisation Act, 1956 came into effect from 1 November 1956, and consequently, the Tamil-speaking area of Sengottai taluk of Quilon district were transferred from Travancore-Cochin to Tirunelveli district of Madras State. Sengottai was reclassified from a Grade III municipality to a Grade II municipality as per G.O. No.85 dated 22 May 1998.

Demographics 

According to 2011 census, Sengottai had a population of 26,823 with a sex-ratio of 1,035 females for every 1,000 males, much above the national average of 929. A total of 2,642 were under the age of six, constituting 1,327 males and 1,315 females. Scheduled Castes and Scheduled Tribes accounted for 10.06% and 1.21% of the population respectively. The average literacy of the town was 78.09%, compared to the national average of 72.99%. The town had a total of 7146 households. There were a total of 10,736 workers, comprising 114 cultivators, 674 main agricultural labourers, 1,923 in household industries, 7,435 other workers, 590 marginal workers, 14 marginal cultivators, 60 marginal agricultural labourers, 105 marginal workers in household industries and 411 other marginal workers.

As per the religious census of 2011, Shenkottai had 76.98% Hindus, 21.19% Muslims, 1.77% Christians and 0.06% following other religions.

Geography and Climate

References

External links 
 

Cities and towns in Tirunelveli district